The Battle of Al Wajbah was an armed conflict that took place in March 1893 in Qatar, a province of the Ottoman Empire's Najd sanjak at that time. The conflict was initiated after Ottoman officials imprisoned 16 Qatari tribal leaders and ordered a column of troops to march toward the Al Thani stronghold in the village of Al Wajbah in response to kaymakam Jassim Al Thani's refusal to come to Ottoman authority.

The main battle took place in Al Wajbah Fort. After the Ottomans' unsuccessful attempt at seizing the fort, they retreated first to Shebaka Fort, and then to their fort in Al Bidda. Shortly after, Al Thani's troop besieged the fortress and cut off the water supply of the neighborhood, resulting in the concession of defeat by the Ottomans. Following this was an agreement to relinquish the Qatari captives in return for the safe passage of Mehmed Pasha's cavalry to Hofuf by land.

Although Qatar did not gain full independence from the Ottoman Empire, the result of the battle is seen by Qatar as a defining moment in the establishment of Qatar as a modern state and the Ottoman's rule was over in Qatar.

Background
Despite the disapproval of local tribes, Al Thani continued supporting Ottoman rule. However,  Qatari-Ottoman relations soon stagnated, and in 1882 they suffered further setbacks when the Ottomans refused to aid Al Thani in his expedition of Abu Dhabi-occupied Khawr al Udayd. Al Thani fell out of favour with the Ottomans after they received complaints from Qataris regarding his oppressions from 1885 to 1886. In a further blow to bilateral relations, the Ottomans supported the Ottoman subject Mohammed bin Abdul Wahab who attempted to supplant Al Thani as kaymakam of Qatar in 1888.

In 1890, the Ottomans attempted to further consolidate their influence over Qatar by imposing numerous administrative reforms, increasing taxes and stationing additional troops in their garrison at Al Bidda. This eventually led Al Thani to rebel against the Ottomans, who he believed were seeking to usurp control of the peninsula. He resigned as kaymakam and stopped paying taxes in August 1892.

Chronology

Negotiations
In October 1892, an Ottoman army comprising approximately 200 men led by the governor of Basra, Mehmed Hafiz Pasha, was sent to Qatar in response to Al Thani's transgressions. They arrived in February 1893, with further reinforcements en route from Kuwait. Al Thani, fearing that he would face death or imprisonment, fled first to Al Daayen, and then to Al Wajbah Fort (10 miles west of Doha) where he was accompanied by several Qatari tribes.

Mehmed sent a letter to Al Thani demanding that he disband his troops and pledge loyalty to the Ottomans. However, Al Thani remained adamant in his refusal to comply with Ottoman authority, and, additionally, refused to meet with Mehmed himself on the basis of ill health. Instead, he appointed his brother, Ahmed bin Mohammed Al Thani, as his emissary. In March, after a month of back-and-forth parleying, Mehmed lost patience and imprisoned Al Thani's brother and between 13 and 16 prominent Qatari tribal leaders on the Ottoman corvette Merrikh. He also blockaded the village of Al Wajbah.

Al Thani offered to pay a fee of ten thousand liras in return for the captives' release, but Mehmed declined his offer.

Battle
After declining Sheikh Jassim Al Thani's offer, Mehmed ordered a column of troops to advance towards Al Wajbah Fort under the command of general Yusuf Effendi. Shortly after Effendi's troops arrived at Al Wajbah, they came under heavy gunfire from Qatari infantry and cavalry troops, which totalled 3,000 to 4,000 men. After seven hours of exchange of gunfire, the Ottomans retreated to Shebaka fortress, where they sustained further casualties from a Qatari incursion. The Ottomans also lost contact with their incoming reinforcements from Kuwait, as their messages had been intercepted by Qatari Bedouins.

The Ottoman troops retreated for a third time, to their fortress in Al Bidda, where their corvette was stationed. They proceeded to fire indiscriminately at the townspeople, killing a number of civilians. Shortly after, Al Thani's advancing column besieged the fortress and cut off the water supply of the neighbourhood. Without water and lacking in supplies, the Ottomans conceded defeat and agreed to relinquish the Qatari captives in return for the safe passage of Mehmed's cavalry to Hofuf by land.

A report by the British government published one year after the battle states the following:

Aftermath
Out of fear of further rebellion, the Ottoman government granted Al Thani a full pardon. Furthermore, the Ottoman sultan, Abdülhamid II, deposed Mehmet Hafiz Pasha as governor of Basra. Although Qatar did not gain full independence from the Ottoman Empire until 1915, the result of the battle further consolidated the Al Thani rule over the country. It is also seen by Qataris as a defining moment in the establishment of Qatar as a modern state.

References

Bibliography
 
 
 
 
 
 

Conflicts in 1893
1893 in Qatar
Battles involving Qatar
Wars involving the Ottoman Empire
Ottoman period in Qatar